Steamshovel Press is a zine devoted to conspiracy theories and parapolitics. The magazine was started in 1992. It was founded and previously published by Kenn Thomas. The magazine was named after one of Bob Dylan's song, From A Buick Six from Highway 61 Revisited. The headquarters is in St. Louis.

Featured authors

 Andrew A. Skolnick
 David Black
 Len Bracken
 Alexandra Bruce
 David Childress
 Philip Gounis
 Jim Keith
 Greg Krupey, "The High & the Mighty" (Steamshovel Press #10)
 Joel Levy
 Jim Martin, "Quigley, Clinton, Straight, and Reich" (Steamshovel Press #8, Summer 1993)
 Olav Phillips
 Robert Sterling (Editor of Konformist.com, not the actor)

References

 ISBN Search

Books and journals referencing Steamshovel Press
 A Very Private Woman: The Life and Unsolved Murder of Presidential Mistress Mary Meyer, Nina Burleigh, Bantam, 1998, 
 American Extremism: History, Politics and the Militia Movement, Darren Mulloy, Routledge, 2004, p. 219, 
 ‘Play It Again, Sam, and Again’: Obsession and Art, Lennard J. Davis, Journal of Visual Culture 8, SAGE Publications, 2006, vol. 5: pp. 242–266

Books mentioning Steamshovel Press
 The Pushcart Prize XVIII: 1993 1994: Best of the Small Presses, Bill Henderson, Pushcart Press, 1993, p. 550, 
 Fear Itself: Enemies Real and Imagined in American Culture, Nancy Lusignan Schultz, Purdue University Press, 1999, p. 31,

External links
 Official site
 Order Print Copies
 Old site at University of Missouri - St. Louis (archived at Internet Archive dating back to March 12, 1997)

1992 establishments in Missouri
Conspiracy
Magazines established in 1992
Magazines published in St. Louis
Paranormal magazines
Political magazines published in the United States
Small press publishing companies